The S-procedure or S-lemma is a mathematical result that gives conditions under which a particular quadratic inequality is a consequence of another quadratic inequality. The S-procedure was developed independently in a number of different contexts and has applications in control theory, linear algebra and mathematical optimization.

Statement of the S-procedure  
Let F1 and F2 be symmetric matrices, g1 and g2 be vectors and h1 and h2 be real numbers. Assume that there is some x0 such that the strict inequality  holds. Then the implication 

holds if and only if there exists some nonnegative number λ such that 
 
is positive semidefinite.

References 

Control theory
Linear algebra
Mathematical optimization